The Tathāgatagarbha sūtras are a group of Mahayana sutras that present the concept of the "womb" or "embryo" (garbha) of the tathāgata, the buddha. Every sentient being has the possibility to attain Buddhahood because of the tathāgatagarbha.

This concept originated in India but was a major influence in the development of East Asian Buddhism, where it was equated with the concept of Buddhadhātu, "buddha-element" or "buddha-nature".

The Tathāgatagarbha sūtras include the Tathāgatagarbha Sūtra, Śrīmālādevī Siṃhanāda Sūtra, Mahāyāna Mahāparinirvāṇa Sūtra and the Aṅgulimālīya Sūtra. Related ideas are in found in the Laṅkāvatāra Sūtra and Avataṃsaka Sūtra. Another major text, the Awakening of Faith, was originally composed in China, while the Mahāyāna Mahāparinirvāṇa Sūtra was considerably extended in China .

Comparing the tradition of Tathāgatagarbha sūtras to the Yogachara and Madhyamaka schools, Paul Williams writes that this collection appears to have been less prominent in India, but became increasingly popular and significant in Central Asian Buddhism and East Asian Buddhism.

Nomenclature and etymology
The Sanskrit term tathāgatagarbha may be parsed into tathāgata "the one thus gone" (referring to Buddhahood) and garbha "root, embryo, essence".

Development of the concept

Luminous mind in the Nikāyas
In the Anguttara Nikāya, the Buddha refers to a "luminous mind".

The canon does not support the identification of the "luminous mind" with nirvanic consciousness, though it plays a role in the realization of nirvana. Upon the destruction of the fetters, according to one scholar, "the shining nibbanic consciousness flashes out of the womb of arahantship, being without object or support, so transcending all limitations."

Tathagatagarbha and Buddha-nature
Though the tathagatagarbha and the Buddha-nature do not have exactly the same meaning, in the Buddhist tradition they became equated. In the Angulimaliya Sūtra and in the Mahāyāna Mahāparinirvāṇa Sūtra the terms "Buddha-nature" (Buddha-dhātu) and "tathāgatagarbha" are synonyms.

All are agreed that the tathāgatagarbha is an immortal, inherent transcendental essence or potency and that it resides in a concealed state (concealed by mental and behavioural negativities) in every single being, even the worst - the icchantika.

Although attempts are made in the Buddhist sutras to explain the tathāgatagarbha, it remains ultimately mysterious and allegedly unfathomable to the ordinary, unawakened person, being only fully knowable by perfect Buddhas themselves.

The tathāgatagarbha itself needs no cultivation, only uncovering or discovery, as it is already present and perfect within each being:

Charles Muller comments that the tathagatagarbha is the mind's original pure nature and has neither a point of origination nor a point of cessation: 'tathagatagarbha expresses the already perfect aspect of the original nature of the mind that is clear and pure without arising or cessation.'  

The tathāgatagarbha is the ultimate, pure, ungraspable, inconceivable, irreducible, unassailable, boundless, true and deathless quintessence of the Buddha's emancipatory reality, the very core of his sublime nature.

List of sutras
Michael Radich provides the following list of key Indian sutras associated with Tathāgatagarbha: 
 Tathāgatagarbha Sūtra (200-250 CE)
 Śrīmālādevī Siṃhanāda Sūtra (3rd century CE)
 Anūnatvāpurnatvanirdeśa
 Mahābherīhārakaparivarta (Great Dharma Drum Sutra) 
 Mahamegha Sūtra (Great Cloud Sutra)
 Aṅgulimālīya Sūtra
 Mahāyāna Mahāparinirvāṇa Sūtra (c. 200 CE), very influential in Chinese Buddhism
 Laṅkāvatāra Sūtra (3rd century CE), integrating Tathāgatagarbha and Yogachara

Karl Brunnhölzl, drawing on the Tibetan tradition, provides the following list of 24 sutras "explicitly or implicitly associated with tathagatagarbha":

 Tathāgatagarbhasūtra 
 Anūnatvāpurnatvanirdeśa
 Śrīmālādevī Siṃhanādasūtra
 Dharanisvararajasutra
 Mahāyānamahāparinirvāṇasūtra
 Aṅgulimālīyasūtra
 Mahābherīsūtra 
 Laṅkāvatārasūtra 
 Tathāgatagunajñanacintyavisayavataranirdesasutra
 Sarvabuddhavisayavatarajñanalokalamkarasutra
 Ratnadārikāsūtra
 Mahāmeghasūtra
 Abhidharmamahāyānasūtra
 Sthirādhyāsayaparivartasūtra
 Avikalpapravesadharani
 Sunyatanamamahasutra
 Buddhāvataṃsakasūtra
 Ratnakuta
 Suvarnaprabhasottamasutra
 Saṃdhinirmocanasūtra
 Gaganagañjaparipṛcchsūtra
 Sāgaramatiparipṛcchāsūtra
 Prasantaviniscayapratiharyanamasamadhisutra
 Candrapradipasutra

Overview of major sutras

Tathāgatagarbha Sūtra (200-250 CE)
The Tathāgatagarbha Sūtra presents the tathāgatagarbha as a virtual Buddha-homunculus, a fully wisdom-endowed Buddha, "a most victorious body ... great and indestructible", inviolate, seated majestically in the lotus position within the body of each being, clearly visible only to a perfect Buddha with his supernatural vision. This is the most "personalist" depiction of the tathāgatagarbha encountered in any of the chief Tathāgatagarbha sutras and is imagistically reminiscent of Mahāyāna descriptions of the Buddha himself sitting in the lotus posture within his own mother's womb prior to birth: "luminous, glorious, gracious, beautiful to see, seated with his legs crossed" and shining "like pure gold ..."

Śrīmālādevī Siṃhanāda Sūtra (2nd century CE)
Some of the earliest and most important Tathāgatagarbha sūtras have been associated by scholars with certain early Buddhist schools in India.

Brian Edward Brown dates the composition of the Śrīmālādevī Siṃhanāda Sūtra to the Andhra Ikshvaku in the 3rd century CE, as a product of the Mahāsāṃghikas of the Āndhra region. Wayman has outlined eleven points of complete agreement between the Mahāsāṃghikas and the Śrīmālā, along with four major arguments for this association.

Sree Padma and Anthony Barber also associate the earlier development of the Tathāgatagarbha Sūtra with the Mahāsāṃghikas, and conclude that the Mahāsāṃghikas of the Āndhra region were responsible for the inception of the Tathāgatagarbha doctrine. 
According to the Śrīmālādevī Siṃhanāda Sūtra, the tathāgatagarbha is "not born, does not die, does not transfer, does not arise. It is beyond the sphere of the characteristics of the compounded; it is permanent, stable and changeless." Moreover, it has been described as "the sphere of experience of the Tathāgatas [Buddhas]."

Mahāyāna Mahāparinirvāṇa Sūtra (c. 200 CE)

The Nirvana Sutra is an eschatological text. Its core was written in India in a time which was perceived as the age in which the Buddha-dharma would perish, and all the Mahayana sutras disappear. The sutra responds to this awaited end with the proclamation of the tathagatagarbha, the innate Buddhahood present in all man.

According to Sallie B. King, the Mahaparinirvana Sutra does not represent a major innovation, and is rather unsystematic, which made it "a fruitful one for later students and commentators, who were obliged to create their own order and bring it to the text". According to King, its most important innovation is the linking of the term buddhadhātu with tathāgatagarbha. 

Buddhadhātu, "Buddha-nature", "the nature of the Buddha", that what constitutes a Buddha, is a central topic of the Nirvana sutra. According to Sally King, the sutra speaks about Buddha-nature in so many different ways, that Chinese scholars created a list of types of Buddha-nature that could be found in the text. The "nature of the Buddha" is presented as a timeless, eternal "Self", which is akin to the tathāgatagarbha, the innate possibility in every sentient being to attain Buddhahood and manifest this timeless Buddha-nature. This "hidden treasury" is present in all sentient beings:

This does not mean that sentient beings are at present endowed with the qualities of a Buddha, but that they will have those qualities in the future. It is obscured from worldly vision by the screening effect of kleshas, tenacious negative mental afflictions. The most notable of which are greed, hatred, delusion, and pride. Once these negative mental states have been eliminated, however, the buddhadhātu is said to shine forth unimpededly and the buddhadhātu can then be consciously "entered into", and therewith deathless Nirvana attained:

Anunatva Apurnatva Nirdeśa
The development of the Buddha-nature doctrine is closely related to that of Buddha-matrix (Sanskrit: tathāgatagarbha). In the Anunatva-Apurnatva-Nirdesa, the Buddha links the tathāgatagarbha to the Dharmadhātu (ultimate, all-equal, uncreated essence of all phenomena) and to essential being, stating: "What I call "be-ing" (sattva) is just a different name for this permanent, stable, pure and unchanging refuge that is free from arising and cessation, the inconceivable pure Dharmadhatu."

Angulimaliya Sūtra
Every being has Buddha-nature (Buddha-dhatu). It is indicated in the Aṅgulimālīya Sūtra that if the Buddhas themselves were to try to find any sentient being who lacked the Buddha-nature, they would fail. In fact, it is stated in this sutra that the Buddhas do discern the presence of the everlasting Buddha-nature in every being:

Belief and faith in the true reality of the tathāgatagarbha is presented by the relevant scriptures as a positive mental act and is strongly urged; indeed, rejection of the tathāgatagarbha is linked with highly adverse karmic consequences. In the Angulimaliya Sutra it is stated that teaching only non-self and dismissing the reality of the tathāgatagarbha karmically lead one into most unpleasant rebirths, whereas spreading the doctrine of the tathāgatagarbha will bring benefit both to oneself and to the world.

Laṅkāvatāra Sūtra (3rd century CE)
The later Laṅkāvatāra Sūtra presents the tathāgatagarbha as being a teaching completely consistent with and identical to emptiness. It synthesizes tathāgatagarbha with the emptiness (śūnyatā) of the prajñāpāramitā sutras. Emptiness is the thought-transcending realm of non-duality and unconditionedness: complete freedom from all constriction and limitation.

The Laṅkāvatāra Sūtra describes the tathāgatagarbha as "by nature brightly shining and pure," and "originally pure," though "enveloped in the garments of the skandhas, dhātus and ayatanas and soiled with the dirt of attachment, hatred, delusion and false imagining." It is said to be "naturally pure," but it appears impure as it is stained by adventitious defilements. Thus the Laṅkāvatāra Sūtra identifies the luminous mind of the canon with the tathāgatagarbha.

It also equates the tathāgatagarbha (and ālaya-vijñāna) with nirvana, though this is concerned with the actual attainment of nirvana as opposed to nirvana as a timeless phenomenon. 

In the later Laṅkāvatāra Sūtra it is said that the tathāgatagarbha might be mistaken for a self, which it is not. In fact, the sutra states that it is identical to the teaching of no-self.

In Section XXVIII of the Laṅkāvatāra Sūtra, Mahāmati asks Buddha, "Is not this Tathagata-garbha taught by the Blessed One the same as the ego-substance taught by the philosophers?" The Buddha's response:

Yet in the concluding Sagathakam portion of the text, coming after the above-quoted passage, the sutra does not deny the reality of the Self; in fact it castigates such denial of the 'pure Self'. According to Thomas Cleary, "The original scripture rigorously rejects nihilism and does not ultimately deny either self or world", and quotes the sutra: 
"Confused thinkers without guidance are in a cave of consciousness running hither and thither seeking to explain the self. The pure self has to be realized first hand; that is the matrix of realization [Tathagatagarbha], inaccessible to speculative thinkers." 

The tathāgatagarbha doctrine became linked (in syncretic form) with doctrines of Citta-mātra ("just-the-mind") or Yogācāra. Yogācārins aimed to account for the possibility of the attainment of Buddhahood by ignorant sentient beings: the tathāgatagarbha is the indwelling awakening of bodhi in the very heart of samsara. There is also a tendency in the tathāgatagarbha sutras to support vegetarianism, as all persons and creatures are compassionately viewed as possessing one and the same essential nature - the Buddha-dhatu or Buddha-nature.

Treatises 
There are two very influential treatises (shastras) on Buddha nature (which draw on and systematize the sutra material), the Ratnagotravibhāga (which is very influential in Tibetan Buddhism), and the Awakening of Faith in the Mahayana (6th century CE), a shastra (commentary) written in China, which is very important in East Asian Buddhism.

Ratnagotravibhāga 
Of disputed authorship, the Ratnagotravibhāga (otherwise known as the Uttaratantra), is the only Indian attempt to create a coherent philosophical model based on the ideas found in the Tathāgatagarbha Sutras. The Ratnagotravibhāga especially draws on the Śrīmālādevī Siṃhanāda Sūtra. Despite East Asian Buddhism's propensity for the concepts found in the Tathāgatagarbha Sutras, the Ratnagotravibhāga has played a relatively small role in East Asian Buddhism. This is due to the primacy of sutra study in East Asian Buddhism.

The Ratnagotravibhāga sees the Buddha-nature (tathāgatagarbha) as "suchness" or "thusness" - the abiding reality of all things - in a state of tarnished concealment within the being. The idea is that the ultimate consciousness of each being is spotless and pure, but surrounded by negative tendencies which are impure. Paul Williams comments on how the impurity is actually not truly part of the Buddha-nature, but merely conceals the immanent true qualities of Buddha mind (i.e. the buddha-nature) from manifesting openly:

See also

Notes

References

Sources

Further reading
 Jones, C.V. (2016). Beings, Non-Beings, and Buddhas: Contrasting Notions of tathāgatagarbha in the Anūnatvāpūrṇatvanirdeśaparivarta and Mahābherī Sūtra, Journal of the Oxford Centre for Buddhist Studies 5, 53-84
 Hodge, Stephen (2009 & 2012)."The Textual Transmission of the Mahayana Mahaparinirvana-sutra", lecture at the University of Hamburg
 Kiyota Minoru (1985), Tathāgatagarbha Thought: A Basis of Buddhist Devotionalism in East Asia, Japanese Journal of Religious Studies,  12, (2), 207–229
 Scott Hurley (2004), The doctrinal transformation of twentiety-century Chinese Buddhism: Master Yinshun's interpretation of the tathagatagarbha doctrine, Contemporary Buddhism 5 (1).
 Takasaki Jikidõ  (2000), The Tathāgatagarbha Theory Reconsidered: Reflections on Some Recent Issues in Japanese Buddhist Studies(pdf file), Japanese Journal of Religious Studies,  27,  (1–2),  73–83
 Zimmermann, Michael (2002), A Buddha Within: The Tathāgatagarbhasūtra, Biblotheca Philologica et Philosophica Buddhica VI, The International Research Institute for Advanced Buddhology, Soka University

External links
 "Nirvana Sutra": full text of "Nirvana Sutra", plus appreciation of its teachings. or PDF
 "Tathagatagarbha Buddhism": text of main "tathagatagarbha" sutras.
Heng-Ching Shih, "The Significance Of 'Tathagatagarbha' -- A Positive Expression Of 'Sunyata."
 The Lion's Roar of Queen Srimala Discourse English translation.
 Digital Dictionary of Buddhism: Entry on Tathagatagarbha (log in with userID "guest")

Ancient Chinese philosophical literature
Buddhist philosophy
Mahayana sutras
Religious philosophical literature
Buddha-nature